Edziza can refer to:

Mount Edziza
Mount Edziza volcanic complex